FUCAFF (Website) is the acronym for the Federation of Uganda Customs Agents & Freight Forwarders, an exclusive umbrella association for member clearing firms or companies registered in Uganda. With the slogan Fostering Tax Compliance with Stakeholders, it was formed in 2009 after UCIFA and its offshoot UFFA to coordinate with URA.

Logistics

The federation's secretariat is based in Kinawataka, Kampala behind the Railway Crossing and fosters clearing and freight forwarding management within the Northern Corridor - the Busiest Transport Network in East Africa. With integrity as a vital component in leadership, it is mandatory for member companies of FUCAFF to be registered with Uganda Revenue Authority.

See also

 Transport in Uganda
 Northern Corridor

Business organisations based in Uganda
Freight forwarders associations